is a Japanese fencer. She has won medals at several editions of the Asian Fencing Championships and, in 2014, she won one of the bronze medals in the women's team foil event at the 2014 Asian Games held in Incheon, South Korea.

Career 

In 2014, she won the silver medal in the girl's foil event at the Summer Youth Olympics held in Nanjing, China. She also won the gold medal in the mixed team event. In 2018, she was eliminated in her first match in the women's foil event at the 2018 World Fencing Championships held in Wuxi, China. In the same year, she won the gold medal in the women's team foil event at the 2018 Asian Games held in Indonesia. She also competed in the women's individual foil event without winning a medal.

She competed at the 2022 World Fencing Championships held in Cairo, Egypt.

Personal life 
Miyawaki was interested in sports from a young age; her sister took up fencing in elementary school and Miyawaki would go with her to practice. She attended Keio Girls' High School (reportedly because "[she] wanted to go to a high school that would let [her] fence instead of making [her] study for university examinations". She subsequently majored in economics at Keio University, where she was a member of the Keio Fencing Club.

References

External links 
 

Living people
1997 births
People from Tokyo
Sportspeople from Tokyo
Japanese female foil fencers
Fencers at the 2014 Summer Youth Olympics
Competitors at the 2017 Summer Universiade
Asian Games gold medalists for Japan
Asian Games bronze medalists for Japan
Asian Games medalists in fencing
Fencers at the 2014 Asian Games
Fencers at the 2018 Asian Games
Medalists at the 2014 Asian Games
Medalists at the 2018 Asian Games
20th-century Japanese women
21st-century Japanese women